Murray Hill is a historic home located at Delhi in Delaware County, New York, United States. It was built in 1867 and is a frame building with an irregular plan in the Italian Villa style.  It consists of a two-story, ell-shaped main block with lower wings extending from the south side and rear. It features a three-story tower above the main entrance with a one-story porch extending across the front.  Also on the property is a two-story tenant house and a barn.

It was listed on the National Register of Historic Places in 1982.

See also
National Register of Historic Places listings in Delaware County, New York

References

Houses on the National Register of Historic Places in New York (state)
National Register of Historic Places in Delaware County, New York
Italianate architecture in New York (state)
Houses completed in 1867
Houses in Delaware County, New York